Ludwig Göransson is a Swedish composer, film and television scorer, record producer, multi-instrumentalist, and songwriter based in Los Angeles, California. He is best known for his work with American rapper Childish Gambino and American film director Ryan Coogler.

Albums
 How to Find a Party (2013)

Songwriting and production credits

Filmography

Films

Television

References 

Discographies of Swedish artists
Film and television discographies
Discography